Odoribacteraceae  is a Gram-negative, anaerobic and non-spore-forming family in the order of Bacteroidales.

References

Further reading 
 

Bacteroidia